Merkanooka is a small town in the Mid West region of Western Australia.

References

Shire of Morawa
Towns in Western Australia